Events in the year 1865 in Norway.

Incumbents
Monarch: Charles IV

Events
22 September – Frederik Stang founds the Norwegian Red Cross

Arts and literature

Births
8 January – Ivar Flem, newspaper editor (died 1948).
15 January – Finn Blakstad, farmer and politician (died 1941)
21 January – Agnes Steineger, painter (died 1965).
6 February – William Martin Nygaard, publisher and politician (died 1952)
12 June – Anders Beer Wilse, photographer (died 1949)
15 September – Knut Gjerset, Norwegian-American professor, author  and historian (died 1936)
8 October – Adolph Gundersen, Norwegian-American medical doctor, founder of Gundersen Lutheran Medical Center (died 1938)
2 November – Paul Olaf Bodding, missionary, linguist and folklorist (died 1938)
30 November – Rolf Jacobsen, jurist, politician and Minister (died 1942)

Full date unknown
Haakon Martin Evjenth, politician (died 1934)
Lars Jorde, painter (died 1939)
Ole Monsen Mjelde, politician and Minister (died 1942)
Martin Ulvestad, historian and author (died 1942)

Deaths
11 June – Nils Fredrik Julius Aars, priest and politician (born 1807)
10 July – Ulrik Anton Motzfeldt, jurist and politician (born 1807)

Full date unknown
Hans Glad Bloch, politician (born 1791)

See also

References